Don’t Explain is the title of the second DVD by the Umbilical Brothers, the first being SpeedMouse. It is a recording of the stage show of the same name and was released in November 2007. The show, which was filmed at the Athenaeum Theatre in Melbourne, was nominated for the 2008 ARIA Award for Best Comedy Release. 

The show itself (rather than the DVD) was positively reviewed in the Adelaide Theatre Guide (June 2008) and Time Out (October 2012).

Plot 
Don’t Explain is a selection of skits that contain no overall plot; the title references this. There are however, recurring themes throughout the show, one of which is an attempt by Dave to get the hand-held microphone off Shane; this leads to the climax in which they both have microphones. Another is the performance of visual comedy from Europe by Hans And Klaus.

Characters 
 Shane Dundas as Shane
 David Collins as Dave
 James Savage as Monique
 Tina as herself
 Fluffy, courtesy of Hans & Klaus
 The Koala, courtesy of Hans & Klaus

Sections 
Fourth Wall
Action Guy
Dog
Hans And Klaus
For Ze Kids
BBQ
Mood Change
Don’t Explain
Klaus Solo
Face Off
Race Off
Chase Off!

Awards 
Aria Awards
2008 – Best Comedy Release (lost to Shaun Micallef – The Expurgated Micallef Tonight)

References

External links 
 Umbilical Brother’s Official Website
 IMDB Entry

Australian comedy